Pleasant Ridge is an unincorporated community in Harrison County, in the U.S. state of Missouri.

History
A post office called Pleasant Ridge was established in 1854, and remained in operation until 1876. The name Pleasant Ridge is commendatory.

References

Unincorporated communities in Harrison County, Missouri
Unincorporated communities in Missouri